Farr may refer to:

 Farr Alpaca Company
 Farr, Sutherland, a hamlet in, and alternate name of, Strathnaver, Scotland.
 Farr, Strathnairn, a village in Strathnairn, to the south of Inverness, Scotland
 Farr Yacht Design
 Farr (surname), people with the surname Farr
 Forţele Aeriene Regale ale României (FARR), Royal Romanian Air Force
 Farr, a former US air filtration company listed on NASDAQ, now part of Camfil Farr
 Farr, the Zoroastrian concept of God's favor, also called khvarenah

See also
 Farr West, Utah, a US city